"All My Life" is a hit song written by Karla Bonoff and originally performed by Bonoff on her album New World (1988).

The following year, Linda Ronstadt and Aaron Neville performed the song as a duet on Ronstadt's triple platinum-certified album Cry Like a Rainstorm, Howl Like the Wind (1989); this was the second global hit from Ronstadt and Neville.

The song was released as a single in early 1990 and hit number 1 on the Billboard Adult contemporary chart (where it held for three weeks) as well as number 11 on both the Cash Box Top 100 and the Billboard Hot 100 chart. It was another international hit for the duo. It reached number 10 in Canada and Ireland.

"All My Life" won the award for Best Pop Performance by a Duo or Group with Vocal at the 1991 Grammy Awards.

Personnel
 Linda Ronstadt – vocals
 Aaron Neville – vocals
 Don Grolnick – piano
 Andrew Gold – guitar, keyboards
 Michael Landau – guitar
 Lee Sklar – bass
 Russ Kunkel – drums
 Michael Fisher – percussion
 Robbie Buchanan – keyboards
 Skywalker Symphony Orchestra arranged and conducted by David Campbell

Charts

Weekly charts

Year-end charts

References

1989 songs
1990 singles
Linda Ronstadt songs
Aaron Neville songs
Male–female vocal duets
Songs written by Karla Bonoff
Song recordings produced by Peter Asher
Elektra Records singles